The 2012–13 Adelaide Bite season is the third season for the team. As was the case for the previous seasons, the Bite will compete in the Australian Baseball League (ABL) with the other five foundation teams, and is expected to again play its home games at Coopers Stadium.

Offseason

Regular season

Standings

Record vs opponents

Game log

|- bgcolor=#ffbbbb
| 1
| 1 November
| 
| 3–9
| V. Vasquez
| Z. Fuesser
| N/A
| 874
| 0-1
|  
|- bgcolor=#ffbbbb
| 2
| 2 November
| 
| 3–13
| A. Claggett
| P. Mildren
| 
| 1,454
| 0-2
| 
|- bgcolor=#ffbbbb
| 3
| 3 November 
| 
| 4–8
| D. Schmidt
| R. Olson
| 
| 1,578
| 0-3
|  
|- bgcolor=#ffbbbb
| 4
| 9 November
| @ 
| 1-5
| J. Hussey
| R. Olsen
| 
| 1,116 
| 0-4
|  
|- bgcolor=#bbffbb
| 5
| 10 November
| @ 
| 4-0
| Z. Fuesser
| H. Koishi
| 
| 1,228
| 1-4
|  
|- bgcolor=#ffbbbb
| 6
| 11 November
| @ 
| 2–7
| S. Gibbons
| P. Mildren
| 
| 296
| 1-5
|   
|- bgcolor=#ffbbbb
| 7
| 22 November
| 
| 2–6
| J. Staatz
| D. Ruzic
| 
| 795
| 1-6
|  
|- bgcolor=#bbffbb
| 8
| 23 November
| 
| 7–6
| Z. Fuesser
| J. Albury
| A. Kittredge
| 2,125
| 2-6
|  
|- bgcolor=#bbffbb
| 9
| 24 November (DH 1)
| 
| 5–2
| D. Fidge
| C. Smith
| A. Kittredge
| 
| 3-6
|  
|- bgcolor=#ffbbbb
| 10
| 24 November (DH 2)
| 
| 3–7
| R. Searle
| W. Lee
| 
| 1,345
| 3-7
|   
|- bgcolor=#ffbbbb
| 11
| 30 November
| @ 
| 2–8
| B. Grening
| P. Mildren
| 
| 1,128
| 3-8
|  
|-

|- bgcolor=#bbffbb
| 12
| 1 December (DH 1)
| @ 
| 7–6
| R. Olson
| S. Kent
| A. Kittredge
| 
| 4-8
|  
|- bgcolor=#ffbbbb
| 13 
| 1 December (DH 2)
| @ 
| 3–6
| R. Dickmann
| D. Fidge
| S. Toler
| 1,112
| 4-9
|  
|- bgcolor=#ffbbbb
| 14
| 2 December
| @ 
| 2–4
| E. Massingham
| D. Ruzic
| S. Toler
| 703
| 4-10
|  
|- bgcolor=#bbffbb
| 15
| 7 December
| 
| 10–4
| R. Olson
| Y. Nakazaki
| 
| 936
| 5-10
|  
|- bgcolor=#bbffbb
| 16
| 8 December (DH 1)
| 
| 5–3
| A. Kittredge
| A. Blackley
| 
| -
| 6-10
|  
|- bgcolor=#bbffbb
| 17
| 8 December (DH 2)
| 
| 18–1
| P. Mildren
| S. Gibbons
| 
| 1,504
| 7-10
|  
|- bgcolor=#bbffbb
| 18
| 9 December
| 
| 9–8
| R. Olson
| Z. Arneson
| 
| 545
| 8-10
|  
|-
| 19
| 13 December
| @ 
| –
| 
| 
| 
| 
| 
| 
|-
| 20
| 14 December (DH 1)
| @ 
| –
| 
| 
| 
| 
| 
| 
|-
| 21
| 14 December (DH 2)
| @ 
| –
| 
| 
| 
| 
| 
| 
|-
| 22
| 15 December
| @ 
| –
| 
| 
| 
| 
| 
| 
|-
| 23
| 21 December
| 
| –
| 
| 
| 
| 
| 
| 
|-
| 24
| 22 December (DH 1)
| 
| –
| 
| 
| 
| 
| 
| 
|-
| 25
| 22 December (DH 2)
| 
| –
| 
| 
| 
| 
| 
| 
|-
| 26
| 23 December
| 
| –
| 
| 
| 
| 
| 
| 
|-
| 27
| 27 December
| @ 
| –
| 
| 
| 
| 
| 
| 
|-
| 28
| 28 December
| @ 
| –
| 
| 
| 
| 
| 
| 
|-
| 29
| 29 December
| @ 
| –
| 
| 
| 
| 
| 
| 
|-
| 30
| 30 December
| @ 
| –
| 
| 
| 
| 
| 
| 
|-

|-
| 31
| 3 January
| 
| –
| 
| 
| 
| 
| 
| 
|-
| 32
| 4 January
| 
| –
| 
| 
| 
| 
| 
| 
|-
| 33
| 5 January (DH 1)
| 
| –
| 
| 
| 
| 
| 
| 
|-
| 34
| 5 January (DH 2)
| 
| –
| 
| 
| 
| 
| 
| 
|-
| 35
| 10 January
| @ 
| –
| 
| 
| 
| 
| 
| 
|-
| 36
| 11 January
| @ 
| –
| 
| 
| 
| 
| 
| 
|-
| 37
| 12 January
| @ 
| –
| 
| 
| 
| 
| 
| 
|-
| 38
| 13 January
| @ 
| –
| 
| 
| 
| 
| 
| 
|-
| 39
| 17 January
| @ 
| –
| 
| 
| 
| 
| 
| 
|-
| 40
| 18 January
| @ 
| –
| 
| 
| 
| 
| 
| 
|-
| 41
| 19 January
| @ 
| –
| 
| 
| 
| 
| 
| 
|-
| 42
| 20 January
| @ 
| –
| 
| 
| 
| 
| 
| 
|-
| 43
| 24 January
| 
| –
| 
| 
| 
| 
| 
| 
|-
| 44
| 25 January
| 
| –
| 
| 
| 
| 
| 
| 
|-
| 45
| 26 January
| 
| –
| 
| 
| 
| 
| 
| 
|-
| 46
| 27 January
| 
| –
| 
| 
| 
| 
| 
| 
|-

Roster

References

Adelaide Giants
Adelaide Bite